Romolo is an Italian given name, and may refer to:

 Robert Bellarmine (1542–1621), Saint and Cardinal of the Roman Catholic Church
 Romolo Ferri (1928–2015), Italian Grand Prix motorcycle road racer
 Romolo Gessi (1831–1881), Italian soldier
 Romolo Valli (1925–1980), Italian actor

See also
 
 Romulus (disambiguation)
 Romolo (Milan Metro), a Line 2 station between Viale Romolo and Largo Alberto Ascari

Italian masculine given names